Getamej (also Romanized as Getamech; until 1948, Ketran) is a town in the Kotayk Province of Armenia.  'Getamej' translates roughly to English as 'Mid-River'.

See also 
Kotayk Province

References 

Populated places in Kotayk Province